Trichodesma zeylanicum, commonly known as Northern bluebell, camel bush or cattle bush, is a herb or shrub native to Australia.

Description
It grows as an erect herb or shrub up to two metres high, with a well-developed taproot. Flowers are blue, or rarely white.

Taxonomy
This species was first published as Borago zeylanica by Nicolaas Laurens Burman in 1768. In 1810, Robert Brown transferred it into Trichodesma, but this was retained only until 1882, when Ferdinand von Mueller transferred it into Pollichia. In 1891, Otto Kuntze transferred it into Boraginella, and in 1898 William Philip Hiern transferred it into Borraginoides. Despite these many later transfers, it is Brown's placement that is currently accepted.

Varieties
Three varieties are recognised:
 T. zeylanicum var. grandiflorum
 T. zeylanicum var. latisepalum
 T. zeylanicum var. zeylanicum

Distribution and habitat
It is fairly widespread in Australia, occurring in Western Australia, the Northern Territory, South Australia, Queensland and New South Wales.

Gallery

References

Asterids of Australia
zeylanicum
Flora of New South Wales
Flora of the Northern Territory
Flora of Queensland
Flora of South Australia
Eudicots of Western Australia
Taxa named by Nicolaas Laurens Burman